Guillermo Canciani (born 18 November 1918) was an Argentine sports shooter. He competed in the 50 m rifle event at the 1936 Summer Olympics.

References

External links
 

1918 births
Possibly living people
Argentine male sport shooters
Olympic shooters of Argentina
Shooters at the 1936 Summer Olympics
Place of birth missing